The SS4 (short for Indonesian: Senapan Serbu 4, "Assault Rifle 4") is a battle rifle being developed by PT Pindad.

Design
The new rifle will use 7.62×51mm NATO round, have an adjustable buttstock unlike the other SS series which have fixed elevated buttstock, an adjustable iron sights, a tripod might become a permanent accessory.

Though the name bore the series name the SS (Senapan Serbu) meaning Assault Rifle it is actually a Battle Rifle (Senapan Tempur in Indonesian) which have an effective range up to 300–600 meters. PT Pindad promises that the new rifle will have three variant:
 Riflemen variant will have an effective range up to 100-300 meter.
 Marksmen variant will have an effective range up to 300-600 meter.
 Sniper variant will have an effective range up to 600-1000 meter.

See also
List of battle rifles
Pindad SS1
Pindad SS2
Pindad SS3

References
 Commando Magazine 2011, volume VII, edition no. 1

7.62×51mm NATO battle rifles
Post–Cold War military equipment of Indonesia
Firearms of Indonesia